Edison High School is a public high school near Richmond, Ohio, United States.  It is the only secondary school within in the Edison Local School District, covering students from the villages of Amsterdam, Bergholz, Empire, Irondale, Richmond, and Stratton, as well as most unincorporated areas in northern Jefferson County. Athletic teams compete as the Edison Wildcats in the Ohio High School Athletic Association as a member of the Buckeye 8 Athletic League as well as the Ohio Valley Athletic Conference. Edison is a very agriculturally active district, with an FFA club which goes nationally to events. Edison also offers specialized career pathways which prepare students for their post-graduation careers, focusing on engineering, public service, biomedical science, and technological advancements.

History
The school was formed in the 1980s as Edison South High School from the merger of three existing high schools; the Jefferson Union High School (Yellow Jackets), Stanton High School (Raiders), and Springfield High School (Tigers), represented by a mural on campus. Later, it was merged with Edison North High School in Hammondsville.

Athletics
Edison High School fields athletic teams in football, basketball, track, cross country, volleyball, golf, baseball, soccer, softball, swimming, and wrestling.

OHSAA State Championships

 Boys Cross Country* – 1938, 1940 
 Boys Track and Field* – 1957, 1958 
 * Titles won by Springfield High School prior to consolidation.

OVAC Conference Championships
Baseball - 1996, 1997, 2000, 2003, 2011, 2012, 2013, 2018
Girls Basketball - 2003, 2010, 2012
Football - 2002, 2022
Golf - 1998
Boys Soccer - 2002, 2004
Girls Soccer - 2010, 2011
Softball - 1994, 1995, 2001, 2002, 2003, 2005, 2009, 2010, 2018
Volleyball - 1996, 2001, 2004, 2008, 2010, 2012
Cheerleading - 2022

Buckeye 8 Conference Championships
Boys Basketball - 2015
Softball - 2016, 2017
Football - 2022

References

External links
Edison High School
Edison Local School District – Official site.

High schools in Jefferson County, Ohio
Public high schools in Ohio